Megaphysa is a monotypic moth genus of the family Crambidae described by Achille Guenée in 1854. It contains only one species, Megaphysa herbiferalis, described by the same author in the same year, which is found in Colombia and Ecuador.

References

Spilomelinae
Monotypic moth genera
Moths of South America
Crambidae genera
Taxa named by Achille Guenée